CBH grain receival points (also known as the bins or wheat bins in local popular usage) are grain silos spread around Western Australia, primarily in the wheatbelt region.  Historically they have been linked with the wheatbelt railway lines, and the transport of grain to ports for export.

Public art 
The range of available bins or grain silos have taken on identity as large public art works in the 2010s in the Public Silo Trail, with three sections to the trail identified:
 The Northern Trail
 Northam
 Merredin
 The "Central Heart" Trail – involving
 Katanning
 Pingrup
 Newdegate
 The "Wave to wave" Trail – involving
 Ravensthorpe
 Albany

Beginnings
The earlier bins were made at the time of the change from wheat transport in bags, to bulk operations – and at the time of the creation of the CBH Group in 1933.

The first five bins or grain receival points were located at Western Australian Government Railways sidings at:
 Benjaberring
 Korrelocking
 Nembudding
 Trayning
 Yelbeni

Due to their size, many of the storage bins were significant landmarks on the landscape in the agricultural communities of Western Australia.

Deregulation and competition
In 2012, the Australian federal government deregulated the grain market in Australia.

In 2013, after 80 years of operation without competition, grain storage and transport in the Great Southern region has another operator due to a separate grain operation at Albany.

Hierarchy
In earlier years the districts in the CBH system were known as "Directors" Districts.

By 2011, the Western Australian wheatbelt operations of CBH was split up into 12 management zone areas, with a set of locations in each zone with management offices, port terminals, and transfer depots identified.

Geraldton Port zone
The Geraldton Port zone is served by two areas – one based in Geraldton, and the second based in Morawa.

Area 1
 Geraldton as the main office, and Port Terminal

The primary receival sites for this zone are:
 Northampton 
 Mullewa
 Mingenew

The secondary receival sites for this zone are:
 Binnu
 Canna
 Moonyoonooka
 Wongoondy

The closed receival sites for this zone are:-
 Pindar – east of Mullewa
 Sullivan – south of Mullewa

Historically, in this area there were also 1933 installation receival points at:
 Balla  
 Ogilvie
 Naraling
 Wilroy
 Tardun

Area 2
 Morawa

Kwinana Port zone
 Kwinana

Area 3
 Wongan Hills

Area 4
 Koorda

Area 5
 Merredin

Area 6
 Avon ( Northam )

Area 7
 Corrigin

Albany Port zone
 Albany

Area 8
 Lake Grace

Area 9
 Katanning

Area 10
 Albany office

Esperance Port zone
 Esperance

Area 11
 Esperance office

Area 12
 Esperance office

Grain storage types

Most grain receival points in the wheatbelt have combinations of historic structures that are still utilised, and new structures. Where the older structures tend to be next to, or aligned with the railway lines where they were built, many sites have extended grounds.  As a consequence, identifying the types of silo/containers at some sites may uncover up to three or four different structures at the one location. Brookton for example has at least three different types present on the CBH property.

Grain receival points
Total numbers of receival points in the system from the founding in 1932 to 1999 – the peak number occurring in 1965-1967:

 1932/33 5        
 1933/34 53       
 1936/37 103      
 1937/38 136      
 1938/39 174      
 1953/54 267
 1954/55 271
 1955/56 273
 1956/57 278
 1957/58 276
 1965/66 305
 1966/67 305
 1967/68 305
 1968/69 300
 1969/70 300
 1978/79 214
 1979/80 212
 1980/81 210
 1981/82 206
 1982/83 196
 1994/95 196
 1995/96 196
 1996/97 197
 1997/98 198
 1998/99 198

Notes

Grain receival points of Western Australia
CBH Group